Ornipholidotos nigeriae, the Nigerian glasswing, is a butterfly in the family Lycaenidae. It is found in southern Nigeria and south-western Cameroon. The habitat consists of forests.

References

Butterflies described in 1964
Ornipholidotos